Boccaccio (aka Boccaccios Liebesnachte) is a 1920 Austrian silent film directed by Michael Curtiz and starring Paul Lukas and Ica von Lenkeffy. Gustav Ucicky was the cinematographer. The film was released in Austria in January of 1920.

External links

1920 films
1920s German-language films
Films based on works by Giovanni Boccaccio
Films directed by Michael Curtiz
Austrian silent feature films
Austrian black-and-white films